Fulton Speedway is a 3/8th mile high bank dirt oval raceway in Volney, New York.  The track was built into a hilly area on the banks of the Oswego River in a natural bowl, with seating high above the track, on a hill.

History
Millard “Bub” Benway and his brother Ray used their construction business, Benway Bros. Construction, to build a  1/3 mile paved oval under the name Mil-Ray Raceway.     The  first event was held June 24th, 1961, and a 1/8 mile dragstrip began operations on  July 15th, 1962 and ran for a decade.    

Asphalt racing was on the weekly schedule until 1978. The track was reopened as a 3/8 mile dirt oval in 1979.    

in July 1998, Harvey, Joan, and David Fink purchased the track.  Since 2009, the track, along with the Brewerton Speedway, has been owned by John and Laura Wight.  The Wights previously owned the Can-Am Speedway.

References

Dirt oval race tracks in the United States
Sports venues in Oswego County, New York
Motorsport venues in New York (state)
1961 establishments in New York (state)
Sports venues completed in 1961